Emily Lockhart (born December 15, 1994), known professionally as Emma Lockhart, is an American journalist and former child actor, best known for her roles as a young Rachel Dawes in Batman Begins, and Laura in Ace Ventura Jr.: Pet Detective.

She has since transitioned to broadcast journalism as an adult, and currently works in Phoenix, Arizona as a reporter for the "Arizona's Family" duopoly of KTVK/KPHO-TV (channels 3/5) owned by Meredith Corporation.

Acting career
She had numerous small roles in television, movies, and the stage.

Lockhart also appeared in The Seeker, as Gwen Stanton.

She was the young Rachel Dawes in Batman Begins (2005).

She was the female lead in Ace Ventura Jr: Pet Detective, which was released in March 2009, direct to video.

Reporting career
Lockhart then attended Arizona State University, majoring in communications as a student at the school's Walter Cronkite School of Journalism and Mass Communication, which produces newscasts for sister operation KAET (channel 8), where she reported, and also anchored the Monday evening edition of the school's Cronkite News broadcast. After graduation, she then worked for two years as a multimedia journalist and weather presenter for KERO-TV (channel 23) in Bakersfield, California, before she took her current position as a reporter with KTVK/KPHO.

Filmography

References

External links

1994 births
21st-century American actresses
American child actresses
American film actresses
American television actresses
American television reporters and correspondents
Living people
American women television journalists
Place of birth missing (living people)